Special educational needs (SEN), also known as special educational needs and disabilities (SEND) in the United Kingdom refers to the education of children who require different education provision to the mainstream system.

Definition
The definition of SEN is set out in the Education Act 1996 and was amended in the Special Educational Needs and Disability Bill of 2001. Currently, a child or young person is considered to have SEN if they have a disability or learning difficulty that means they need special educational provision. Special educational provision means that the child needs support that would not generally be provided to a child of the same age in a mainstream school.

Some examples of SEN include:

 A condition which affects behaviour or social skills, such as ADHD or autism
 A condition that affects the ability to read and write, such as dyslexia or another specific learning difficulty
 A condition which affects the ability to learn, such as a learning disability
 A physical impairment, including a visual impairment, hearing impairment, a chronic health condition or poor mobility.

Support available
There are numerous types of support available depending on the child or young person's disability.
Some support offered includes:
 Following a different learning programme from the rest of the class
 Extra help from a teaching assistant or the class teacher
 Extra supervision in the classroom or at break time
 Working in a smaller group
 Support to communicate with other pupils
 Help with personal care (such as eating or using the toilet)
 Encouragement to complete tasks the pupil struggles with

Public examinations
Some support available for children with SEN include:
 Extra time to complete the examination
 Rest breaks
Alternative formats for exam papers
 Use of a reader
 Use of a scribe
 Use of a live speaker for exams that include audio recordings
 Use of a prompter
 Use of a communication professional (a person who can translate questions into British Sign Language or International Sign Language)
 Use of a practical assistant
 Use of a word processor
 Completing the examination in a separate room or venue from other candidates at the school
 Exemption from certain parts of the qualification.

SEN legal regulations

The SEN systems vary in each nation of the United Kingdom.

England
The current regulations for SEN are set out in the Children and Families Act 2014. Different levels of support are given to children depending on how much support is required. Most children with SEN are given school-level support, known as SEN support. An Education, Health and Care Plan (EHCP) is given to children and young people who are considered to have complex needs. They can be used for children and young people aged 2–25. Children and young people with an EHCP are entitled to a personal budget. Every school must have a Special Educational Needs Co-Ordinator (SENCO), who is responsible for overseeing the support of pupils with SEN. Children with SEN in the UK can attend mainstream or special schools, but legally, local authorities are obliged to educate children in mainstream schools where possible. If a family feels that their child is not receiving sufficient support, they may take their local authority to the Special Educational Needs and Disability Tribunal to appeal any decisions the local authority has made on a child's support.

Local offer
A Local Offer (or LO) is a statement detailing the pattern of support which a local authority expects to be available for children and young people with special educational needs (SEN) and/or disabilities within their area. It must include information about education, health and care provision. It should also tell families about training, employment and independent living options available for young people with special educational needs and/or disabilities. In accordance with the SEND Code of Practice, every local authority must publish a Local Offer. The Local Offer or LO  should
provide clear, comprehensive, accessible and up-to-date information about the available provision and how to access it,
make provision more responsive to local needs and aspirations by directly involving disabled children and those with SEN and their parents, and disabled young people and those with SEN, and service providers in its development and review.

Scotland
In Scotland, the term additional support needs is used instead of SEN. As well as children with disabilities, this also encompasses children who may need support for reasons other than disability, such as children who are being bullied or who are in foster care.
The Education (Additional Support for Learning) (Scotland) Act 2004 redefined the law relating to the provision of special education to children with additional needs by establishing a framework for the policies of inclusion and generally practicing the "presumption of mainstreaming" in education. Children with complex needs who require support from external organisations are given a co-ordinated support plan. Families who are not satisfied with the support given are entitled to take the education authority Additional Support Needs for Scotland Tribunal.

Northern Ireland
Regulations for SEN in Northern Ireland are currently governed by the Special Educational Needs and Disability Act (Northern Ireland) 2016. In Northern Ireland, there are five stages of SEN support. Stages 1 to 3 are known as school-based stages. Stage 1 is when concerns are first raised about a child having SEN, and support is given within the classroom, such as differentiated work or different teaching strategies. If the child's difficulties improve at this stage, the child is no longer classed as having SEN. However, if they do not improve, the child will be moved to stage 2. At stage 2, advice from the child's GP or the school doctor is sought and an education plan is drawn up by the SENCO, which describes the difficulties the child has and the support they need. If the child does not make good progress at stage 2, they move on to stage 3. At stage 3, external specialists, such as educational psychologists are involved in the child's support. If a child does not make progress while on stage 3, they are referred to stage 4. Stage 4 is also known as Statutory Assessment. Children who have very significant disabilities are referred straight to Statutory Assessment without having to go through the school-based stages. Stage 5 is when a SEN statement is issued. The SEN statement sets out the child's difficulties and the support they require, as well as which school the child should attend (this can be a mainstream or special school).

History
Local authorities became responsible for the education of Deaf children and blind children in 1893. The education of children with disabilities became mandatory in the Education Act 1918. The prevailing attitude at the time was that disabled children should be sent to residential schools rather than attending mainstream schools. The 1944 Education Act created provision for children with disabilities to receive "special educational treatment" in special schools. Children were required to have a medical assessment to be eligible for this. Some children were classified as uneducable, and were not required to attend school. The 1970 Education (Handicapped Children) Act removed uneducable category, which allowed all disabled children to receive an education. SEN statements were introduced in 1978 and parents of children with disabilities were given the right to appeal decisions made by local authorities about decisions on their child's education  The 1981 Education Act stated that children should be taught in mainstream schools whenever possible. The role of the Special Needs Coordinator emerged in 1982  to audit mainstream special provision, raise the expectations of fellow teachers and advocate for the disabled even during educational cutbacks. The 1993 Education Act made SENCOs mandatory for all schools and set out guidelines for identifying pupils with SEN and assessing their needs. The 2001 Special Educational Needs and Disability Act outlawed discrimination against disabled pupils in schools, colleges and other education settings. It also introduced the Special Educational Needs and Disability Tribunal. 

Prior to the Children and Families Act 2014, there were three levels of support in England and Wales:
 school action- for pupils with relatively low-level needs who can be supported with additional support provided within school, such as the use of specialist teaching materials in lessons.
 school action plus- for pupils who need additional support from an external support service. For example, a speech and language therapist or an educational psychologist.
 SEN statement-for pupils with more complex needs.

In the English law case of Skipper v Calderdale Metropolitan Borough School (2006) EWCA Civ 238, the Court of Appeal allowed the appellant could claim against her former school for failing to diagnose and treat her Dyslexia.

Criticisms

Underfunding
Funding provision for pupils with Special Education Needs and Disabilities, (SEND) has been criticised as inadequate. Some councils claimed to be unable to carry out their statutory duties towards SEND children due to lack of funding from the central government.  Educators also complained that they cannot educate SEND pupils as effectively as they would like due to lack of funding.

In 2019 the Education Select Committee of the House of Commons published a report stating reforms introduced in 2014 had been badly implemented damaging many SEND pupils.  Children had to do without support they needed, which affected their mental health as well as their education, children experienced anxiety, depression and self-harm, and children as young as nine had attempted suicide.  Children's families had to try and cope with a bureaucracy.  The report also criticised a funding shortfall and called for greater accountability in the system.  More rigorous inspection systems were called for together with clear consequences following failure.  Parents and schools should be able to appeal directly to the DfE if Local Authorities did not meet their legal obligations.  School inspections should focus more on SEND, social care ombudsmen and Local Authorities should have greater powers.  Robert Halfon 
MP said, “The DfE cannot continue with a piecemeal and reactive approach to supporting children with Send. Rather than making do with sticking plasters, what is needed is a transformation, a more strategic oversight and fundamental change to ensure a generation of children is no longer let down.”  Kevin Courtney of the National Education Union said, “Schools and local authorities want to provide the best possible support for SEND pupils, but the tools needed are generally no longer available due to cuts to local services.”  The Local Government Association stated, “Councils support the reforms set out in the Children and Families Act in 2014, but we were clear at the time that the cost of implementing them had been underestimated by the government.” In some cases parents withdrew their children from school resulting in action from authorities to force attendance. A group of parents are mounted a legal challenge to this.

Exclusions and off-rolling
Children with SEN are much more likely to be formally excluded from school or off-rolled. Off-rolling is where a pupil is removed from a school's register, often shortly before GCSEs are due to be taken, which can cause the child's education to be discontinued. There have been claims that children with SEN who are unlikely to achieve the national target of five GCSEs at grades 4 to 9 are being excluded or off-rolled to raise a school's position in league tables. Anne Longfield, the children's commissioner, said “I have become more and more convinced that some schools are seeking to improve their overall exam results by removing vulnerable children from the school roll...sadly this can include children with Send, who have no option but to go into inappropriate alternative provision or home education.”

Over-identification
There have been claims that affluent families will push for their child to be identified as having SEN so that the child can access additional support when the child may not genuinely have any disability. The number of children identified as having SEN has increased. Figures published in 2009 showed that 17.8% of pupils in English schools have SEN an increase from 14.9% in 2005, leading to claims that schools are labelling too many children as having SEN. Lorraine Petersen, the former chief executive of the National Association of Special Educational Needs, has said “they [parents] feel a label will give the child and perhaps the family additional support that they may not get without it; access to benefits, for instance, or support with exams or a place in a specialist setting.” In other cases, schools have been accused of identifying non-disabled children as having SEN to hide poor teaching standards.

Under-identification
Conversely, some people argue that there is a problem with children with disabilities not being identified as needing additional support. This is said to be especially difficult for low-income families, who may not be able to afford private diagnostic assessments for conditions such as dyslexia. Bernadette John, the SEN director of The Good Schools Guide, says: "There’s a good reason why middle-class parents are better able to get a special needs diagnosis for their child: cash. There is a dire shortage of educational psychologists in local authorities, and children can expect a wait of at least a year to see one for a diagnosis."

See also
 Disability Discrimination Act 1995 (UK)
 Disabled Student's Allowance for university students with a disability
 Education (Additional Support for Learning) (Scotland) Act 2004
 Inclusion (disability rights)
 Learning disabilities in special education
 Learning theory (education)
 Qualified specialist dyslexia teachers
 Special education
 Teaching and Learning Research Programme

Notes

References

External links
2010 Ofsted Report on SEN 'A Statement is not Enough'
The Bercow Report
The Council for the Registration of Schools Teaching Dyslexic Pupils
Sir Jim Rose Presents Findings of Review into Dyslexia
NASEN ― Special Educational Needs charity
PATOSS ― association of SEN teachers

 
 
Disability in the United Kingdom
Education in the United Kingdom
United Kingdom education-related lists

et:Hariduslik erivajadus
es:Necesidades educativas especiales
gl:Necesidades educativas especiais
pt:Necessidades educativas especiais